Fairuza Balk (born May 21, 1974) is an American actress, musician, and visual artist. Influential in popular culture, Balk is known for her portrayals of distinctive "goth-girl" characters, often with a dark edge. She has appeared in numerous independent films and blockbuster features in both leading and supporting roles.

Following a series of television film roles, Balk made her feature film debut as Dorothy Gale in the fantasy Return to Oz (1985), for which she was nominated for the Young Artist Award for Best Starring Performance By a Young Actress - Motion Picture. Her career progressed with roles in the drama films Valmont (1989) and Gas Food Lodging (1992), the latter earning her the Independent Spirit Award for Best Female Lead. After appearing in the historical drama Imaginary Crimes (1994) and the crime drama Things to Do in Denver When You're Dead (1995), Balk earned acclaim for her role in the horror film The Craft (1996), which earned her a nomination for the Saturn Award for Best Supporting Actress, and a cult following. She has since appeared in The Island of Dr. Moreau (1996), American History X (1998), The Waterboy (1998), Almost Famous (2000), Personal Velocity: Three Portraits (2002), Deuces Wild (2002), Don't Come Knocking (2005), Wild Tigers I Have Known (2006), Humboldt County (2008), and Bad Lieutenant: Port of Call New Orleans (2009).

On television, Balk portrayed Mildred Hubble in the 1986 adaptation of The Worst Witch, based on the book series of the same name. She appeared in the recurring role of Ginger on Showtime's Ray Donovan in 2015, and currently stars as Lizzie Thomas on the Amazon Prime series Paradise City (2021). Balk has been releasing music since 2010 under the name of her unsigned act, Armed Love Militia.

Early life
Balk was born on May 21, 1974, in Point Reyes, California to Solomon Feldthouse (born David Earle Scaff; 1940–2021), a musician, and Catherine Balk (1944–2018), a belly dancer. The name Fairuza is of  Persian origin meaning "turquoise". Her father gave her the name for the color of her eyes. Feldthouse was one of the founding members of the 1960s psychedelic rock group Kaleidoscope, and was also a traveling folk musician. 

Until the age of two, Balk lived in Jackson, Michigan with her mother. They then moved to Vancouver, British Columbia, where she began acting at age six. They moved to London and then to Paris for another role. They remained there for six months before returning to Vancouver. 
Balk owned an occult shop in Los Angeles as a young woman upon signing to act in the 1996 film The Craft.

Career
Balk took her first acting course around the summer of 1983, where she was taught how to look at a camera and not be shy. Her first experience was in a British Columbia tourism commercial, for which she earned $100. Her debut role was in a 1983 television film titled The Best Christmas Pageant Ever. While in London, Balk was cast by Walt Disney Productions to star as Dorothy Gale in Return to Oz, the sequel to MGM's 1939 musical The Wizard of Oz. This role led to other minor roles, including that of Mildred Hubble in The Worst Witch. In 1988, at age 14, she moved to Paris to work on Valmont with Miloš Forman. She decided to take correspondence courses and went back to Hollywood, where she gained increasing notice as an actress. In 1992, she was awarded an Independent Spirit Award as best actress for her performance in the Allison Anders film Gas Food Lodging.

In 1996, she appeared in a lead role in The Craft, in which her character formed a teenage coven with characters portrayed by Neve Campbell, Rachel True and Robin Tunney. Since then, Balk has continued to find roles, primarily dark ones. In 1996, she co-starred in The Island of Dr Moreau. In 1998, she played a neo-Nazi goth-punk opposite Edward Norton in American History X, and was featured in The Waterboy, alongside Adam Sandler. Since 2000, she has appeared in over a dozen films and was briefly in a band called G-13. She has also done voice work for animated films, TV shows and video games, including Justice League, Family Guy, Grand Theft Auto: Vice City and Lords of EverQuest. The 2007 documentary Return to Oz: The Joy That Got Away was dedicated to her.

In 2010, Armed Love Militia, Balk's musical outlet, released the single "Stormwinds". The track was written and sung by Balk. Armed Love Militia continued, with Balk collaborating on an EP with singer and songwriter Mel Sanson.

In 2011, Balk began to exhibit art in Los Angeles and New York. On August 4, 2012, she participated in the group show 'MiXTAPE', with other notable artists Mark Ryden, Camille Rose Garcia, Jessicka Addams, and Marion Peck. Artists were asked to pick a song and create art inspired by that song. Balk chose the song "Nuages" by Django Reinhardt and created a 16"x20"x12" mixed-media sculpture. The eclectic mix of songs chosen were featured for digital download on iTunes.

In 2017, the emo puppet band Fragile Rock performed a song titled "Fairuza Balk" on their NPR Tiny Desk Concert.

Filmography

References

External links

1974 births
Living people
20th-century American actresses
21st-century American actresses
Actresses from the San Francisco Bay Area
American child actresses
American expatriates in Canada
American expatriates in France
American expatriates in England
American film actresses
American television actresses
American video game actresses
American voice actresses
Independent Spirit Award for Best Female Lead winners
People from Cloverdale, California
People from Jackson, Michigan
People from Point Reyes, California